The Governor Baxter School for the Deaf (GBSD), formerly known as the Maine School for the Deaf is a public co-educational school that serves the deaf and hard-of-hearing in the State of Maine. It is located on Mackworth Island, an approximately  island in Falmouth, Maine, USA, adjacent to its border with Portland, Maine. Students who live far away may stay with host families, who provide residential services. Its program is the Maine Educational Center for the Deaf and Hard of Hearing (MECDHH).

History 

In 1943, Maine's governor Percival P. Baxter deeded the island and causeway, including his summer home, to the State of Maine. In 1957, the state created the Governor Baxter School for The Deaf (formerly known as the Maine School for The Deaf) on the island.

Since 2009, GBSD is now a mainstream program within the Portland Public Schools.  The preschool program remains on Mackworth Island.

Programs
Students from far away may live with host families. Previously the school contracted with the Sue Wright House of Spurwink. Before then the school had its own dormitory.

In 1991 deaf people protested against a proposal by the administration of Governor of Maine John McKernan to stop operations of the dormitory.

Student body
In 1991 the school had 70 students, with about 12-24 of them boarding.

References

Further reading
 Governor Baxter School for the Deaf
 

Schools for the deaf in the United States
Public schools in Maine
Schools in Cumberland County, Maine
Public K-12 schools in the United States
Public elementary schools in Maine
Public middle schools in Maine
Public high schools in Maine
Public boarding schools in the United States
Boarding schools in Maine